Edstone Aqueduct is one of three aqueducts on a  length of the Stratford-upon-Avon Canal in Warwickshire. All are unusual in that the towpaths are at the level of the canal bottom.  At ,  Edstone is the longest cast iron aqueduct in England. It crosses a minor road, a stream, and a field, a railway line (the North Warwickshire Line) and the trackbed of the disused Alcester branch line. There was once a pipe from the side of the canal that enabled steam locomotives to draw water to fill their tanks.

The aqueduct was completed in 1816 and is an early example of a prefabricated structure. Its cast iron trough is formed of 35 separate sections bolted together, which sits on thirteen brick piers, creating 14 spans. The towpath is set level with the base of the trough, which is a somewhat unusual design feature.

The aqueduct is a Grade II* listed  structure.

See also
 List of canal aqueducts in the United Kingdom

References

External links 

Stratford-upon-Avon Canal
Navigable aqueducts in England
Buildings and structures in Warwickshire
Bridges in Warwickshire
Grade II* listed bridges in England
Grade II* listed buildings in Warwickshire
Cast iron aqueducts